To the Beat of a Different Drum is a double album by jazz musician John Coltrane released posthumously in 1978. It is a compilation of recordings in which Roy Haynes replaced Coltrane's regular drummer Elvin Jones.

"Impressions", "I Want To Talk About You" and "My Favorite Things" were recorded live at the Newport Jazz Festival in July 1963. "After The Rain" and "Dear Old Stockholm" are studio recordings from April 1963. "After The Crescent", "One Down, One Up" and "Dear Lord" are studio recordings from May 1965.

The tracks were later reissued on CD by GRP Records: the live recordings on the Newport '63 album and the studio recordings under the title Dear Old Stockholm in 1993. The 1963 Newport tracks were also reissued in 2007 on the compilation My Favorite Things: Coltrane at Newport.

Reception

In a review for AllMusic, Scott Yanow wrote: "This LP is well worth acquiring, for it includes two fine numbers from 1963..., a selection from the Quartet's very successful appearance at the 1963 Newport Jazz Festival, and three originals... dating from 1965. It's an excellent release that is both fiery and spiritual."

Track listing
"Impressions" – 15:52
"I Want To Talk About You" – 8:17
"My Favorite Things" – 17:31
"After the Rain" – 4:07
"Dear Old Stockholm" – 10:35
"After The Crescent – 13:34
"One Down, One Up" – 15:25
"Dear Lord" – 5:34

Personnel
John Coltrane – tenor saxophone
Jimmy Garrison – double bass
Roy Haynes – drums
McCoy Tyner – piano

References

1978 compilation albums
John Coltrane compilation albums
Impulse! Records compilation albums
Albums recorded at Van Gelder Studio
Compilation albums published posthumously